Philippe Jaccottet (30 June 1925 – 24 February 2021) was a Swiss Francophone poet and translator.

Life and work 

After completing his studies in Lausanne, he lived for several years in Paris. In 1953, he moved to the town of Grignan in Provence. He has translated numerous authors and poets into French, including Goethe, Hölderlin, Mann, Mandelstam, Góngora, Leopardi, Musil, Rilke, Homer and Ungaretti. He was awarded the German international Petrarca-Preis in 1988 for his poetry.

In 2014, Philippe Jaccottet became the fifteenth living author to be published in the prestigious Bibliothèque de la Pléiade. After Jean-Jacques Rousseau, Blaise Cendrars and Charles-Ferdinand Ramuz, he was the fourth Swiss author to be published in the Bibliothèque de la Pléiade.

Jaccottet died in Grignan, France, in February 2021 at the age of 95.

Honours 
 1958 Prix des écrivains vaudois
 1966 Johann-Heinrich-Voß-Preis für Übersetzung
 1981 Prix Gottfried Keller 
 1985 Grand Prix de Poésie de la Ville de Paris
 1988 Petrarca-Preis
 1995 Grand Prix national de Poésie
 2003 Prix Goncourt de la poésie
 2018 Prix mondial Cino Del Duca

Publications 

 L'Effraie, 1953
 L'Entretien des muses, 1968 
 Paysages avec figures absentes, 1970
 Chant d'En-bas, 1974
 Rilke par lui-même, 1971
 À la lumière d'hiver, 1974
 Des Histoires de passage, 1983 
 Pensées sous les nuages, 1983 
 La Semaison, Carnets 1954-1967, 1984
 Une Transaction secrète, 1987
 Cahier de verdure, 1990 (poem Cherry Tree, Eng. trans. Mark Treharne)
 Requiem, 1991
 Libretto, La Dogana, 1990
 Poésie, 1946-1967, Poésie/Gallimard, Paris, (1971) 1990 
 Requiem (1946) ; suivi de, Remarques (1990), Fata Morgana, 1991 
 Cristal et fumée, Fata Morgana, 1993 
 A la lumière d'hiver ; précédé de, Leçons ; et de, Chants d'en bas ; et suivi de, Pensées sous les nuages, Gallimard, 1994 (poem Learning, trans. Mark Treharne, Delos Press, 2001)
 Après beaucoup d'années, Gallimard, 1994 
 Autriche, Éditions L'Age d'homme, 1994 
 Eaux prodigues, Nasser Assar, lithographies, La Sétérée, J. Clerc, 1994 
 Ecrits pour papier journal : chroniques 1951-1970, texts gathered and présented by Jean Pierre Vidal, Gallimard, 1994 
 Tout n'est pas dit : billets pour la Béroche : 1956-1964, Le Temps qu'il fait, 1994 
 La seconde semaison : carnets 1980-1994, Gallimard, 1996 
 Beauregard, postf. d'Adrien Pasquali, Éditions Zoé, 1997 
 Paysages avec figures absentes, Gallimard, Paris, (1976) 1997, "coll. poésie/gallimard".
 Observations et autres notes anciennes : 1947-1962, Gallimard, 1998 
 A travers un verger ; suivi de, Les cormorans ; et de, Beauregard, Gallimard, 2000 
 Carnets 1995-1998 : la semaison III, Gallimard, 2001 
 Notes du ravin, Fata Morgana, 2001 
 Et, néanmoins : proses et poésies, Gallimard, 2001 
 Le bol du pèlerin (Morandi), La Dogana, 2001. 
 Une Constellation, tout près, La Dogana, 2002. 
 A partir du mot Russie, Fata Morgana, 2002 
 Gustave Roud, présentation et choix de textes par Philippe Jaccottet, Seghers, 2002 
  ; éd. établie, annotée et présentée par José-Flore Tappy, Gallimard, 2002 
 Nuages, Philippe Jaccottet, Alexandre Hollan, Fata Morgana, 2002 
 Cahier de verdure ; suivi de, Après beaucoup d'années, Gallimard, "coll. poésie/gallimard", 2003 
 Truinas, le 21 avril 2001, Genève, La Dogana, 2004 
 De la poésie, entretien avec Reynald André Chalard, Arléa, 2005

See also 
 Swiss literature
 List of Swiss poets

Notes and references

Bibliography
 Alentour de Philippe Jaccottet, Sud no. 80-81, Marseille, 1989.
 "Philippe Jaccottet en filigrane", Revue des sciences humaines, n° 255, Lille, Université Charles-de-Gaulle-Lille III, 1999.
 Marie-Claire DUMAS, La Poésie de Philippe Jaccottet, Paris, Campion, 1986.
 Harvé FERRAGE, Philippe Jaccotet, le pari de l'inactuel, Paris, PUF, 2000.
 Jean-Pierre GIUSTO, Philippe Jaccottet ou le Désir d'inscription, Lille, Presses universitaires de Lille, 1994.
 Yasuaki KAWANABE, Philippe Jaccottet et la Poésie du haiku - "on",L'Un et l'autre,fugures du poème, Revue des Lettres modernes, Paris-Caen, Minard, 2001.
 Jean-Pierre RIHARD, Onze études sur la Poésie moderne, Paris, Seuil, 1964.
 Jean-Pierre VIDAL, Philippe Jaccottet, Paris, Payot, 1990.

External links 

 
 Philippe Jaccottet traducteur et poète : une esthétique de l'effacement, mémoire de maîtrise de Mathilde Vischer
 La poétique de l'espace dans l'œuvre de Philippe Jaccottet, mémoire de licence de Damien Berdot
 Jaccottet et la poétique, article de J.M. Maulpoix.

1925 births
2021 deaths
20th-century French male writers
20th-century French poets
20th-century Swiss poets
21st-century French male writers
21st-century French poets
21st-century Swiss poets
Commandeurs of the Ordre des Arts et des Lettres
French male poets
People from Broye-Vully District
Prix Goncourt de la Poésie winners
Prix Valery Larbaud winners
Swiss male poets
University of Lausanne alumni